Gazprom-Ugra is a Russian men's volleyball club from Surgut. It was founded in 1996. Previously he performed under the names  Gazovik (1996-1997),  Gazovik-ZSK (1997-2000), ZSK-Gazprom  (2000-2007). Basic colors - white and blue.

Achievements
 CEV Cup
  Finalist (1) 2016
 CEV Challenge Cup
 Third (1): 2017-18

References

External links
 Официальный сайт
 Страница на сайте Всероссийской федерации волейбола
Алексей Ашапатов принес России «золото»

Russian volleyball clubs
1996 establishments in Russia